O 3 was a  patrol submarines of the Royal Netherlands Navy. The ship was built by De Schelde shipyard in Flushing.

Service history
The submarine was ordered on 18 March 1910 and 31 December  that year the O 3 was laid down in Flushing at the shipyard of De Schelde. The launch took place on 30 July 1912; later in the autumn that year trials were held.

Commissioning in the navy is delayed by a battery explosion during the trials on 1 November 1912. On 11 February 1913, the ship was finally commissioned. During World War I the ship was based in Flushing.

The Dutch queen Wilhelmina of the Netherlands makes a visit to the ship in Den Helder on 13 September 1914. The visit includes a dive off the coast of Den Helder.

In 1932 the O 3 was decommissioned.

External links
Description of ship

References

1912 ships
Ships built in Vlissingen
O 2-class submarines